Shell Centre is a 33-storey,  office tower in Calgary, Alberta, Canada. At completion in 1977, Shell Centre was the fourth tallest building in Calgary, behind Dome Tower, Bow Valley Square Two, and Stephen Avenue Place.

The Shell Centre was announced by Olympia and York Developments in February 1975 as a $35-million, 33-storey,  tower to be built on the site of the former Caravan Hotel. The building would be Olympia and York's first development in Western Canada, which went ahead despite the absence of a major tenant at announcement. During construction of the building Shell Oil would step forward to become the primary tenant for the building in a plan that would consolidate the oil company's 1,000 employees in Calgary, and changing the name of the building to Shell Centre. Shell Centre's design called for 34,000 cubic yards of concrete and 4,700 tons of steel in construction, and the structure was cladded with 1.25 inch think slabs of Italian granite. The building included two levels of underground parking with capacity for 86 cars. The building was designed in a figure eight shape which allows for eight corner offices, and includes a recessed lobby accessible from street levels behind a series of supportive pillars. The Calgary Herald would note the tower marked a turning point in corporate offices in Calgary, moving away from the traditional simple towers which were previously common in the city, to more elaborate and flamboyant skins of marble and granite which were common in American cities.

See also
List of tallest buildings in Calgary

References

External links

Buildings and structures in Calgary
Skyscrapers in Calgary
Modernist architecture in Canada
Shell plc buildings and structures
Skyscraper office buildings in Canada
Office buildings completed in 1977